Coleherne Court is a large apartment block on the Old Brompton Road in the Earl's Court district of the Royal Borough of Kensington and Chelsea. 

Coleherne Court stands on the site of the former Coleherne House and Hereford House. It was built between 1901 and 1904. It was constructed in red brick and Portland stone.

Notable residents
Princess Mestchersky, a leader of White russian emigres from the Russian Revolution, lived at Coleherne Court following her escape from Russia. The actor Stewart Granger was born in Flat 60 in May 1913. In the 1950s Coleherne Court was the residence of the novelist Brigit Brophy. The actor Corin Redgrave lived at Flat 116 and held meetings of the Workers Revolutionary Party there. Other residents include the authors Stephen Vizinczey in the early 1970s and Sir Charles Petrie, 3rd Baronet in the 1960s.

The Soviet spy Oleg Penkovsky was debriefed by MI6 in July 1961 in a safe house flat they operated in Coleherne Court.

Lady Diana Spencer lived at Flat 60 at Coleherne Court from 1979 to 1981. Diana's deposit on the flat came from the £50,000 that was left to her by her great-grandmother, the American heiress Frances Ellen Work. She subsequently rented out the spare bedrooms of the flat for £18 a week to friends. She moved out of the flat to live at Clarence House shortly before her engagement to Charles, Prince of Wales was announced in 1981. Diana's time at Coleherne Court with her housemates during her courtship with Charles was portrayed in season 4 of The Crown. Diana's mother, Frances Shand Kydd, sold her flat in 1981.

Sophie Rhys-Jones also lived at Coleherne Court prior to her 1999 wedding to Prince Edward, Earl of Wessex.

Coleherne Court has large communal gardens and 24-hour porterage.

References

External links
RBKC Local Studies - Coleherne Court and Hereford House

Apartment buildings in London
Earls Court
Houses in the Royal Borough of Kensington and Chelsea
Residential buildings completed in 1904